Ceclava Czapska (Cécile Czapska) (Bucharest 2 January 1899 – 1 December 1970) was a Romanov impostor who claimed to be the Grand Duchess Maria, daughter of Tsar Nicholas II, the last autocratic ruler of Imperial Russia, and his wife Tsarina Alexandra.

She was the daughter of Polish nobleman, Bolesław Czapski and Raja Ludmilla Tchapline. On 20 January 1919, she and Prince Nikolai Dolgoruky, called 'di Fonz,' were married in Romania. They had two daughters, Olga-Béata (born 1927), mother of Alexis Brimeyer; and Julia-Yolande (born 1937).

She died in Rome. Her grave is in Prima Porta.

The remains off all the Romanovs have been found and identified via DNA testing disproving her claim.

References

Sources
Cécile Czapska
La zarina y sus cuatro hijas sobrevivieron a la matanza de la familia imperial rusa
Martha Schad Wielkie dynastie. Mit i historia – Romanowowie, Warsaw 2003, s. 72.
Le Parchemin, n°225, 1983, pp. 273–277

1899 births
1970 deaths
Impostor pretenders
Romanov impostors
Burials at the Cimitero Flaminio